Waripora Bangil is a village located 2 KMs from the town of magam in the Baramulla district of the Indian-occupied union territory of Jammu and Kashmir.

The Postal Index Number of the area is 193401, and its postal head office is located in Magam. The closest cities to the village are Srinagar, Budgam.

Demographics 

Kashmiri is the natively-spoken language in Waripora Bangil.

Transport

Railways 
Mazhom railway station is about  far from this village.

Airports 

Healthcare system
Sub-district hospital Magam is the main hospital located in the area. SC Dhobiwan Health sub-center is another hospital located near to Waripora Bangil.

Educational institutions

Colleges
 Government degree College Magam.
 Degree college bemina at about 18 km from waripora

Schools
BHSS MAGAM is about 2km from the village
 GHSS Lalpora, Kunzar is  far from Waripora Bangil.
 Al Noor Model School located in Dobiwan, Kunzer is another school operating in the area.
 Government Higher Secondary School Chandilora (12 km away).

References

Villages in Baramulla district